African jade is the colloquial name of

Grossular
Verdite, a variety of Serpentinite